Ralph L. Lenhart (born October 18, 1930) is a former American educator and politician from Montana. Lenhart is a former Democratic member of the Montana House of Representatives who served from January 2003 to January 2007.

Early life 
On October 18, 1930, Lenhart was born in Durand, Wisconsin.

Career 
Lenhart was a mathematics professor at Dawson Community College. Lenhart served as the Interim President of the Montana University System. He is an at-large member for the Dawson Community College Foundation Board.

On November 5, 2002, Lenhart won the election unopposed and became a Democratic member of Montana House of Representatives for District 2.

On November 2, 2004, Lenhart won the election and became a Democratic member of Montana House of Representatives for District 38. Lenhart defeated Larry Heimbuch with 50.96% of the votes.

Personal life 
Lenhart's wife was Shirley Lenhart (1933-2020), who was a nurse and Family Planning Director for Dawson County, Montana. They have three children, Nan, Ned, Kaia. In 1960, Lenhart and his family moved to Glendive, Montana in 1960.

See also 
 Montana House of Representatives, District 2

References

External links 
 Montana Legislature - 2003, Ralph Lenhart at mt.gov
 Ralph Lenhart at mt.gov

Educators from Montana
Democratic Party members of the Montana House of Representatives
People from Dawson County, Montana
1930 births
Living people